Eucalyptus umbra, known as the broad-leaved white mahogany, is a species of small to medium-sized tree that is endemic to northern New South Wales. It has rough, fibrous to stringy bark on the trunk and branches, lance-shaped to curved adult leaves, flower buds in groups of seven to fifteen, white flowers and cup-shaped to hemispherical fruit.

Description
Flowering occurs from September to February and the flowers are white.

Taxonomy and naming
Eucalyptus umbra was first formally described in 1901 by Richard Thomas Baker in Proceedings of the Linnean Society of New South Wales. The specific epithet is a Latin word meaning "shade" or "shadow", possibly referring to the shade provided by the tree.

Distribution and habitat
The broad-leaved white mahogany occurs in the high rainfall coastal areas of New South Wales between Sydney and Grafton. It grows in dry sclerophyll forest or woodland, usually on poor shallow dry soils. It differs from the white mahogany (Eucalyptus latisinensis) of coastal Queensland in having broader juvenile leaves.

Eucalyptus umbra is part of the white mahogany group as recognised by Ken Hill. Others in the group include E. acmenoides, E. mediocris, E. carnea, E. apothalassica, E. helidonica, E. psammitica and E. latisinensis.

References

umbra
Myrtales of Australia
Flora of New South Wales
Trees of Australia
Plants described in 1901
Taxa named by Richard Thomas Baker